The Tay Whale, known locally as the Monster, was a humpback whale that swam into the Firth of Tay of eastern Scotland in 1883. It was harpooned in a hunt, but escaped, and was found floating dead off Stonehaven a week later. It was towed into Dundee by a showman, John Woods, and exhibited on a train tour of Scotland and England.

The Regius Professor of Anatomy at Aberdeen University, John Struthers dissected the whale, much of the time in public with a military band playing in the background, organised by Woods. The decomposing whale made Woods a great deal of money, and Struthers famous.

The doggerel poet William McGonagall wrote a notoriously bad poem, "The Famous Tay Whale", shortly after the events.

History

In December 1883, a humpback whale appeared in the Firth of Tay off the shore of Dundee, at that time Scotland's major whaling port, and attracted much local interest. The whalers normally hunted in the Arctic, but as the whaling boats were in harbour for the winter, some of the whalers decided to hunt this animal in their own waters.

After several failed attempts, they harpooned the humpback on 31 December 1883. It was a strong male, and it towed two rowing boats and two steamboats as far as Montrose and then to the Firth of Forth. After a struggle that lasted all night, the harpoon lines broke and the whale escaped.

A week later the whale was found dead, floating out at sea. It was towed to Stonehaven and dragged onto the beach. John Struthers, the Regius professor of Anatomy at Aberdeen, quickly visited the carcass, recording it as 40 feet long with flukes measuring 11 feet 4 inches. A local entrepreneur, John Woods, bought the whale and had it transported to his yard in Dundee. On the first Sunday that it was there, 12,000 people paid to see it.

The local newspaper, the Dundee Courier, published at least 21 stories on the Tay Whale between 12 November 1883 and 11 January 1884. The headlines included:

 Appearance of a Whale in the River – 12 November
 Whale Hunting in the Tay – 16 November
 Return of the Whale to the Tay – 21 November
 On the Trail of the Whale – 7 December
 Christmas Greeting from the Whale – 25 December
 The Whale Interviewed by his Mother on his Exploits in the River Tay (poem) – 27 December
 The Whale Hunt in the Tay. Exciting Chase – 1 January
 The Whale Hunt in the Tay. Escape of the Whale – 2 January
 The Runaway Whale – 4 January
 The Tay Whale Found Dead – 8 January
 The Whale's Corpus – 9 January
 The Recovered Whale at Stonehaven. Sale of the Monster to a Dundee Man – 11 January
 
Finally on 25 January 1884, when the whale was too badly decomposed for further public exhibition, Struthers was allowed to come and dissect the famous specimen. He was well used to working on stinking carcasses: his dissecting room was reputed to stink "like the deck of a Greenland whaler". He had two assistants; but the dissection was disturbed by John Woods, who admitted the public, for a fee, to watch the dissection in progress, while a military band played in the background.

There were snow showers, but Struthers was able to remove much of the skeleton before Woods had the flesh embalmed; the carcass was then stuffed and sewn up to be taken on a profitable tour as far as Edinburgh and London. Finally on 7 August 1884 Struthers was able to remove the skull and the rest of the skeleton. Struthers eventually wrote seven anatomy articles over the next decade on the whale, and ultimately published a complete monograph on it in 1889, entitled Memoir on the Anatomy of the Humpback Whale, Megaptera Longimana.

In 2011, the whale's skeleton was displayed in the McManus Galleries in Dundee.

Fame for anatomist

Struthers became famous for his dissection of the Tay Whale, his largest specimen. It was one of a wide range of specimens of many species that he energetically collected to form a museum of zoology, to illustrate Darwin's theories.

Fame in doggerel
The whale became so famous that the doggerel poet William Topaz McGonagall (1825–1902) wrote a notably bad poem, "The Famous Tay Whale", about it. Two of the verses run:

This was not the only piece of doggerel verse about the whale, as a poet signing himself "Spectator" published "The Whale Interviewed by his Mother on his Exploits in the River Tay" in the Dundee Courier, with verses such as:

Anatomical drawings of the Tay Whale by John Struthers

See also
 List of individual cetaceans

References

Sources

Further reading
 
 Oxford Dictionary of National Biography.  John Struthers. (Struthers, Sir John (1823–1899), anatomist and medical reformer). Oxford Biography Index Number 101026680.
 
  at Internet Archive

External links

 University of Aberdeen: Connecting Collections: Sir John Struthers (1823-1899)
 McGonagall Online: The Tale of a Whale. The story of the Tay Whale told in contemporary cuttings from the Dundee Courier

Individual humpback whales
Individual wild animals
Wayward cetaceans
1884 animal deaths
1883 in Scotland
1884 in Scotland
History of the North Sea
Whaling in Scotland
History of Dundee
University of Aberdeen
19th century in Dundee